is a 2014 Japanese anime science fiction film. The film is directed by Seiji Mizushima, with a screenplay written by Gen Urobuchi. The film was produced by Toei Animation and animated by Graphinica, and was distributed by T-Joy and Toei Company.

The film had its first public showing in Europe at the Swedish anime-convention ConFusion on December 11, 2014. Seiji Mizushima attended the event himself, partaking in a stage-show, Q&A and other activities.

The film was distributed in the United States by Aniplex of America and was shown in 15 theatres across the country on December 13, 2014.

Plot

Angela Balzac is an agent at the space station DEVA, whose inhabitants have no physical bodies, their minds digitized and processed into a virtual reality environment. After failing to track down the hacker known as "Frontier Setter", who had infiltrated DEVA's systems dozens of times to gather allies for his cause with no success, she is tasked to look for him down on Earth, now a barren planet where less than 2% of the human population lives. After being given a cloned, organic body and sent to the surface, Angela meets Dingo, her contact on Earth, who cuts off all communications with her base, in order to prevent Frontier Setter from discovering their location as well, despite her protests.

Due to Angela's inexperience with organic life, she neglects food and rest and becomes sick, so Dingo cares for her until she gets well. As time passes, she begins to appreciate things deemed unnecessary in DEVA like food and music.

Angela and Dingo's investigations lead them to an abandoned city, where they meet Frontier Setter, who is revealed to be an artificial intelligence system developed to supervise the construction of Genesis Ark, a ship designed for deep space travel, and somehow developed consciousness, continuing its work long after its masters perished and trying without success to recruit volunteers from DEVA to join its space mission. Realizing that Frontier Setter intends to do no harm at all, Angela leaves her body and reports to her superiors at DEVA, who order her to destroy it, fearing that it may eventually become a threat, but she refuses. Angela is branded a traitor and sentenced to have her mind stored into an archive forever, but Frontier Setter hacks into the system to rescue her. Once Angela returns to Earth and her body with supplies and weaponry, she and Dingo join forces to hold back DEVA's other agents long enough for a rocket to be launched carrying Frontier Setter and the final module of the Genesis Ark. Frontier Setter offers for Angela to join it in space, but she chooses to stay with Dingo to experience more of Earth. Angela and Dingo then escape, while Frontier Setter starts its journey through space.

Voice cast

Production

Development
Expelled from Paradise was developed as a joint cinematic project by Toei Animation and Nitroplus. The film is directed by Seiji Mizushima following his work on directing well known anime series such as Fullmetal Alchemist and Mobile Suit Gundam 00.

Gen Urobuchi has been selected as the script writer and is known for writing the script of Puella Magi Madoka Magica and creating the light novel Fate/Zero''.

Marketing

Previews
A trailer titled "Diva Communication" was released on the official website on September 30, 2013.

References

External links

 Official website
 Official website 
 

2014 anime films
2014 computer-animated films
2010s science fiction films
Animated post-apocalyptic films
Anime with original screenplays
Aniplex
Cyberpunk anime and manga
Dystopian films
Films directed by Seiji Mizushima
Films with screenplays by Gen Urobuchi
Graphinica
Japanese animated science fiction films
Mecha anime and manga
Nitroplus
Toei Animation films